Kouchibouguac is a community in the Canadian province of New Brunswick.  Kouchibouguac is also home to Kouchibouguac National Park.

Kouchibouguac is a corruption, partially through the French, of the Micmac Pijeboogwek, meaning "long tideway river"- a descriptive for the length of the river's tidal estuary.  The name was adopted for the region's national park in 1971.

History

Notable people

See also
List of communities in New Brunswick

References

Geographical Names Board of Canada

Communities in Kent County, New Brunswick